The Jesse N. Cypert Law Office is a historic commercial building at 104 East Race Street in Searcy, Arkansas.  It is a vernacular single-story brick structure, sharing party walls with its neighbors.  The front facade is divided into bays by corbelled brickwork, with a double door in the central bay on the first floor, and windows in the flanking bays.  Above these are separately-articulated bays housing vents, and there is a simple brick cornice at the top.  Built c. 1880, this building is a well-preserved local example of the vernacular commercial architecture of the period.

The building was listed on the National Register of Historic Places in 1992.

See also
National Register of Historic Places listings in White County, Arkansas

References

Office buildings on the National Register of Historic Places in Arkansas
National Register of Historic Places in Searcy, Arkansas
Office buildings completed in 1880
1880 establishments in Arkansas
Law offices
Legal history of Arkansas